Semion Grossu Cabinet was the Cabinet of the Moldovan SSR from 1 August 1976 – 30 December 1980. It was led by Semion Grossu, Chairmen of the Council of Ministers (modern day Prime Minister of Moldova) of the MSSR.

Membership of the Cabinet  
 Semion Grossu, Chairman
 Grigore Eremei, Deputy Chairman
 Semion Grossu, Minister of Foreign Affairs
 Lieutenant General Nicolae Bradulov, Minister of Internal Affairs 
 Arkady Ragozin (until January 1979)/Gavriil Volkov, Minister of National Security/Chairman of the Moldovan KGB
 Vasile Cherdivarenco, Minister of Education

Bibliography 
 *** - Enciclopedia sovietică moldovenească (Chişinău, 1970-1977)

 

Moldova cabinets
1976 establishments in the Moldavian Soviet Socialist Republic
1980 disestablishments in the Moldavian Soviet Socialist Republic
Cabinets established in 1976
Cabinets disestablished in 1980